Sanyuan District is a district of the city of Sanming, Fujian province, People's Republic of China.

Administrative divisions
Subdistricts:
Chengguan Subdistrict, Baisha Subdistrict, Fuxingbao Subdistrict, Jingxi Subdistrict

Towns:
Xinkou, Yanqian

Townships:
Chengdong Township, Zhongcun Township

Transportation
Sanming railway station is situated here. The former Sanyuanqu railway station (known as Sanming until 2018) is also located here, but was closed in January 2019.

References

County-level divisions of Fujian
Sanming